Michael Richard Pompeo (born December 30, 1963) is an American politician, former lawyer, and businessman who served under President Donald Trump as director of the Central Intelligence Agency (CIA) from 2017 to 2018 and as the 70th United States secretary of state from 2018 to 2021.  He is the first person to have held both of those positions.

After graduating from the United States Military Academy in 1986 and his obligatory five-year service as a United States Army officer, Pompeo went on to graduate from Harvard Law School. He worked as an attorney until 1998 and then became an entrepreneur in the aerospace and oilfield industries.  Pompeo was elected to the United States House of Representatives from 2011 to 2017, representing .

Once a critic of Donald Trump, whom he called "authoritarian", Pompeo became one of his biggest supporters after Trump became the Republican nominee in the 2016 presidential election.  Trump appointed him Director of the Central Intelligence Agency in January 2017 and Secretary of State in April 2018. Pompeo was the Trump Administration’s most vocal critic of the Chinese government, including his opposition to the oppression of Uyghurs, and focused U.S.-China relations in opposition to China's policies regarding Hong Kong, Taiwan and the South China Sea.  He advocated for moving the American Embassy in Israel to Jerusalem and the withdrawal of the United States from the 2015 nuclear deal with Iran.

During Pompeo's tenure as Secretary of State, he prioritized grounding human rights in religious liberty and brokering peace in the Middle East. He established the Ministerial to Advance Religious Freedom, moved the US Embassy in Israel from Tel Aviv to Jerusalem, and negotiated the Abraham Accords which established diplomatic normalcy between Israel and the United Arab Emirates. He was among the staunchest Trump loyalists in the Cabinet and routinely flouted State Department norms in aid of Trump's objectives, including supporting Trump's efforts to overturn the 2020 presidential election.

Early life and education 

Pompeo was born in Orange, California, the son of Dorothy (born Mercer) and Wayne Pompeo. His paternal great-grandparents, Carlo Pompeo and Adelina Tollis were born in Pacentro, Abruzzo, Italy, and emigrated to the United States in 1899 and 1900, respectively. In 1982, Pompeo graduated from Los Amigos High School in Fountain Valley, California, where he played forward on the basketball team. In 1986, Pompeo graduated first in his class from the United States Military Academy at West Point, where he majored in engineering management. He was a classmate of Brian Bulatao and Ulrich Brechbuhl, who later helped him found Thayer Aerospace.

From 1986 to 1991, Pompeo served in the U.S. Army as an armor officer with the West Germany-based 2nd Squadron, 7th Cavalry in the 4th Infantry Division. He served as a tank platoon leader before becoming a cavalry troop executive officer and then the squadron maintenance officer. Pompeo left the U.S. Army at the rank of captain.

In 1994, Pompeo earned a Juris Doctor from Harvard Law School, where he was an editor of the Harvard Law Review and the Harvard Journal of Law & Public Policy.

Early career 
After graduating from law school, he worked as a lawyer for Williams & Connolly in Washington.

In 1996, Pompeo moved to Wichita, Kansas, where he and three West Point friends, Brian Bulatao, Ulrich Brechbuhl, and Michael Stradinger, acquired three aircraft-part manufacturers there (Aero Machine, Precision Profiling, B&B Machine) and in St. Louis (Advance Tool & Die), renaming the entity Thayer Aerospace after West Point superintendent Sylvanus Thayer. Venture funding for the private organization included a nearly 20% investment from Koch Industries as well as Dallas-based Cardinal Investment, and Bain & Company (Brechbuhl worked for Bain at the time). Brechbuhl and Stradinger left the company shortly after it was founded, but Pompeo and Bulatao continued.

In 2006, he sold his interest in the company, which by then had been renamed Nex-Tech Aerospace, to Highland Capital Management, which had clients including Lockheed Martin, Gulfstream Aerospace, Cessna Aircraft, Boeing, Spirit AeroSystems and Raytheon Aircraft. Pompeo then became president of Sentry International, an oilfield equipment manufacturer that was also a partner of Koch Industries.

In 2017, when Pompeo became head of the CIA, he named his former business partner, Brian Bulatao, the agency's chief operating officer.

U.S. House of Representatives (2011–2017)

Elections 

Pompeo represented Kansas's 4th congressional district from 2011 until his January 2017 appointment to director of the Central Intelligence Agency (CIA).

In the 2010 election, Pompeo won the Republican primary for Kansas's 4th District congressional seat with 39% of the vote, defeating state senator Jean Schodorf (who received 24%) and two other candidates. Late in the primary, Schodorf began to surge in the polls, prompting two outside groups—Common Sense Issues and Americans for Prosperity—to spend tens of thousands of dollars in the campaign's final days to attack Schodorf and support Pompeo. In the general election, Pompeo defeated Democratic nominee Raj Goyle, a member of the Kansas House of Representatives. Pompeo received 59% of the vote (117,171 votes) to 36% for Goyle (71,866). During Pompeo's campaign, its affiliated Twitter account praised as a "good read" a news article that called Goyle, his Indian-American opponent, a "turban topper" who "could be a muslim, a hindu, a buddhist etc. who knows". Pompeo later apologized to Goyle for the tweet. Pompeo received $80,000 in donations during the campaign from Koch Industries and its employees.

In the 2012 election, Pompeo defeated Democratic nominee Robert Tillman by a margin of 62–32%. Koch Industries gave Pompeo's campaign $110,000.

In the 2014 election, Pompeo won the general election with 67% of the vote, defeating Democrat Perry Schuckman.

In the 2016 election, Pompeo beat Democrat Daniel B. Giroux in the general election with 61% of the vote.

Tenure in Congress 

Pompeo served on the United States House Permanent Select Committee on Intelligence, the United States House Committee on Energy and Commerce, the United States House Energy Subcommittee on Digital Commerce and Consumer Protection, the United States House Energy Subcommittee on Energy, the United States House Intelligence Subcommittee on the CIA, and the United States House Select Committee on Benghazi.

Pompeo was a member of the Congressional Constitution Caucus.

Pompeo was original sponsor of the Safe and Accurate Food Labeling Act of 2015.

CIA Director (2017–2018) 

On November 18, 2016, President-elect Donald Trump announced that he would nominate Pompeo to be the director of the Central Intelligence Agency. He was confirmed by the Senate on January 23, 2017, with a vote of 66–32, and sworn in later that day. In his confirmation he failed to disclose the links between his company in Kansas and a Chinese government owned firm.

In February 2017, Pompeo traveled to Turkey and Saudi Arabia. He met with Turkish president Recep Tayyip Erdoğan to discuss policy on Syria and ISIL. Pompeo honored the then-crown prince of Saudi Arabia Muhammad bin Nayef with the CIA's "George Tenet" Medal. It was the first reaffirmation of Saudi Arabia–United States relations since Trump took office in January 2017.
In March 2017, Pompeo formally invoked state secrets privilege to prevent CIA officers, including Gina Haspel and James Cotsana, from being compelled to testify in the trial of Bruce Jessen and James Elmer Mitchell.

In June 2017, Pompeo named Michael D'Andrea head of the CIA's Iran mission center.

In August 2017, Pompeo took direct command of the Counterintelligence Mission Center, the department which helped to launch an investigation into possible links between Trump associates and Russian officials. Former CIA officials, including John Sipher, expressed concern given Pompeo's proximity to the White House and Donald Trump.

In September 2017, Pompeo sought authority for the CIA to make covert drone strikes without the Pentagon's involvement, including inside Afghanistan.

During Easter weekend 2018, Pompeo visited North Korea and met with Supreme Leader Kim Jong-un to discuss the upcoming 2018 North Korea–United States summit between Kim and Trump.

Pompeo usually personally delivered the president's daily brief in the Oval Office. At Trump's request, Pompeo met with former NSA official William E. Binney to discuss his doubts of Russian interference in the 2016 United States elections.

At the suggestion of Tony Perkins, president of the Family Research Council, Pompeo planned to hire chaplains at the CIA.

U.S. Secretary of State (2018–2021)

Nomination and confirmation
President Trump announced on March 13, 2018, that he would nominate Pompeo to serve as secretary of state, succeeding Rex Tillerson, who stepped down on March 31, 2018.

On April 23, the Senate Foreign Relations Committee voted 11–9 in favor of sending Pompeo's nomination to the full Senate, with Senator Chris Coons voting "present" and Johnny Isakson, who was absent that day, voting "yes by proxy". In the interest of saving the committee's time, Coons decided to vote "present", as the vote would have been tied if he had voted no on the nomination with Isakson absent, a situation that would have nullified his vote. The Senate floor vote took place on April 26 and Pompeo was confirmed by the full Senate by a 57–42 vote, with five of ten Democratic senators running for reelection in 2018 in states that Trump won in 2016, voting to confirm Pompeo.

Pompeo was sworn in on April 26, 2018. In testimony before the senate, he promised to prioritize improving the low-morale issue at the State Department.

Tenure as Secretary of State

During his tenure as Secretary of State, Pompeo was described as among the staunchest Trump loyalists in the Cabinet. During his tenure, he routinely flouted norms followed by his predecessors. These included a speech via satellite from Jerusalem supporting Trump's re-election, firing State Department Inspector General Steve Linick, and standing on the sidelines while Trump and his allies conducted a smear campaign against career diplomat Marie Yovanovitch. Under Pompeo's tenure, career State Department officials quit, were forced into retirement or fired, and were replaced by inexperienced political appointees. Like Trump, Pompeo praised dictators and criticized the U.S.'s traditional democratic allies. International relations scholars Daniel Drezner, Richard Sokolsky, and Aaron David Miller described Pompeo as the worst secretary of state in American history, citing numerous foreign policy failures, fealty to Trump at the cost of U.S. national interest, and improprieties in office.

Pompeo played a role in Trump's three summits with North Korean supreme leader Kim Jong-un. The summits failed to achieve any reduction in North Korea's nuclear arsenal. In a 2021 interview with a conservative podcast, Pompeo said that "I regret that we didn't make more progress" on North Korea.

In August 2018, Pompeo thanked Crown Prince Mohammad bin Salman "for Saudi Arabia's support for northeast Syria's urgent stabilization needs". Pompeo and Crown Prince also discussed the situation in war-torn Yemen.

Pompeo condemned the military crackdown by the Myanmar Army and police on Rohingya Muslims. In July 2018, Pompeo raised the issue of Xinjiang internment camps and human rights abuses against the Uyghur minority in China. Pompeo criticized Iran's supreme leader Ayatollah Ali Khamenei for his refusal to condemn the Chinese government's repressions against the Uyghurs.

On October 10, 2018, Pompeo said Israel "is everything we want the entire Middle East to look like going forward" and that the Israel–United States relations are "stronger than ever". In March 2019, when questioned regarding Israel's conflicts with Iran and following a visit to the Western Wall with Israeli prime minister Benjamin Netanyahu, Pompeo spoke to "the work that our administration's done to make sure that this democracy in the Middle East, that this Jewish state, remains... I am confident that the Lord is at work here."

On November 16, 2018, a CIA assessment was leaked to the media, that concluded with "high confidence" Saudi Arabia's crown prince Mohammad bin Salman ordered the October 2, 2018, assassination of Washington Post columnist Jamal Khashoggi. Under mounting pressure from lawmakers who wanted action against Saudi Arabia, Pompeo disputed the CIA's conclusion and declared there was no direct evidence linking the Crown Prince to the Khashoggi's assassination.

In what was seen as an effort to promote his presumed candidacy in the 2024 Republican presidential primary, Pompeo's book, "Never Give an Inch: Fighting for the America I Love," returned to his theme that the assassination and dismemberment was of little international consequence, that the victim was not a reporter of much, if any consequence, and was merely an "activist." He further denigrated Khashoggi as, "...cozy with the terrorist-supporting Muslim Brotherhood.”

On January 7, 2019, Pompeo began a diplomatic tour of the Middle East to assure regional U.S. partners that, amid the sudden withdrawal of U.S. troops from Syria, the U.S. mission to degrade and destroy the Islamic State and to counter Iranian influence in the region had not changed. The trip included stops in Jordan, Iraq, Egypt, and the Gulf nations.

Pompeo announced on January 23, 2019, that Juan Guaidó would be recognized by the U.S. as the legitimate interim president of Venezuela, and that American diplomats in Caracas would remain at their posts, even as Nicolás Maduro gave them three days to evacuate the country upon Guaidó assumption of the presidency. After protests for over "homophobic, racist and misogynist remarks" by Brazilian president Jair Bolsonaro, a ceremony hosted by the Brazilian-American Chamber of Commerce (originally set to honor Pompeo and Bolsonaro) was canceled.

On May 14, 2019, Pompeo met for three hours with Russian Foreign Minister Sergey Lavrov and for ninety minutes with Russian President Vladimir Putin in Sochi, Russia. According to a Kremlin aide, they discussed Syria, North Korea, Iran, Venezuela, and the New Strategic Arms Reduction Treaty (New START); Pompeo said he brought up—and Putin again denied—Russian election interference.

In October 2019, the State Department web site promoted a speech by Pompeo "On Being a Christian Leader", which he delivered to the American Association of Christian Counselors in his official government role. Pompeo touts Christianity in his speech, describes how he applies his faith to his government work. The promotion of the speech by the State Department was met with criticism from those who believed it was incompatible with separation of church and state. He also created the Commission on Unalienable Rights, and created a faith-based employee affinity group that includes contractors.

Pompeo defended the 2019 Turkish offensive into north-eastern Syria, saying Turkey has a "legitimate security concern" with "a terrorist threat to their south". However, Pompeo denied that the United States had given a "green light" for Turkey to attack the Kurds.

In November 2019, Pompeo said the U.S. no longer views Israeli settlements in the occupied West Bank as a violation of international law, breaking with decades of U.S. policy.

In rejecting a claimed double standard in recognizing Israel's annexation of the Golan Heights but placing sanctions on Russia for annexing Crimea in 2014, Pompeo said "What the President did with the Golan Heights is recognize the reality on the ground and the security situation necessary for the protection of the Israeli state."

In January 2020, the Trump administration approved a drone strike that assassinated Iranian General Qasem Soleimani. Pompeo was reportedly among the most hawkish advisors within the administration during the meeting in which Trump decided to assassinate Soleimani. On the day of the strike, Pompeo asserted the attack was ordered by Trump to disrupt an "imminent attack" by Soleimani operatives, although subsequent reports on that rationale were mixed.

In January 2020, Pompeo abruptly ended an interview with Mary Louise Kelly of NPR's All Things Considered, and called her to private quarters where he admonished her for asking questions regarding Ukraine during the interview.

Pompeo praised Trump-brokered peace agreement between Israel and the United Arab Emirates as an "enormous" step forward on the "right path". On August 27, 2020, Pompeo, after visiting Omani Sultan Haitham bin Tarik Al-Said, concluded a Middle East trip aimed at encouraging Arab countries to follow the UAE's move. According to Hugh Lovatt of the European Council on Foreign Relations, "...the lack of any additional public commitments during Secretary Pompeo's regional tour looks like an anti-climax [and] it is possible that a lack of clarity on the U.S. commitment to deliver F-35s to the UAE could have also played a part in slowing a second wave of normalisation."

Madison dinners

From the time he took office in April 2018 until spring 2020, Pompeo had hosted about two dozen taxpayer-funded "Madison dinners" at the Diplomatic Reception Rooms in the State Department's headquarters) for hundreds of elite attendees. The dinners were not mentioned on Pompeo's public schedule. 14% of the invitees were diplomats or foreign officials while approximately 25% were from—mostly conservative—media or the entertainment industry, 29% from the corporate world, and 30% from U.S. politics or government. Every invited congressional member was a Republican. State Department officials and others raised concerns that the dinners did not serve any foreign policy purpose but were intended for Pompeo to cultivate supporters and donors for future political ambitions, especially since detailed contact information for each attendee was sent to Pompeo's wife's personal email address. Pompeo temporarily suspended the "Madison dinners" when the COVID-19 pandemic hit the U.S., but resumed the dinners at the Blair House in September 2020, despite the controversy over them and concerns about public health.

Records obtained by the watchdog group Citizens for Responsibility and Ethics in Washington (CREW) in 2021 through a Freedom of Information Act (FOIA) lawsuit revealed that the dinners had cost almost $65,000, including more than $10,000 for custom-engraved, Chinese-made pens given as gifts to the attendees. The funds for the dinners were taken from a special appropriation fund for emergencies in the diplomatic service called the K Fund. The Office of the Inspector General told CREW that it had not conducted an audit of K Fund expenditures during Pompeo's tenure.

Inspector General investigations

After Trump fired the State Department Inspector General, Steve Linick in May 2020, it became known that Linick had begun an investigation into ethics violations by Pompeo and his wife alleged by whistle-blowers. The investigation continued after his firing, and the review report was released in April 2021. The review had found more than 100 instances of misconduct where Pompeo requested that State Department staff perform personal errands for him and his wife, "from booking salon appointments and private dinner reservations to picking up their dog and arranging tours for the Pompeos' political allies." The inspector general concluded that the behavior was inconsistent with regulations  and "recommended that various divisions at the State Department, such as the Office of the Legal Adviser, update or draft new guidance that establishes or further clarifies the appropriate use of department funds and staffers when it comes to personal tasks."

The Inspector General had also investigated Pompeo's role in the Trump administration's decision to declare an "emergency" to bypass a congressional freeze on arms sales to Saudi Arabia and the UAE. Prior to his firing, Linick had requested an interview with Pompeo, which Pompeo had declined. After Linick's firing, it was also revealed that he was investigating claims that a top Pompeo aide had failed to report allegations of workplace violence. Pompeo denied that he sought to fire Linick in retaliation.

Impeachment inquiry against Donald Trump

When asked about his knowledge of the controversial call made by President Trump on July 25, 2019, to Ukraine's President Volodymyr Zelenskyy, in which Trump solicited assistance in investigating the son of former vice president and presidential candidate Joseph Biden, Pompeo initially said he had little knowledge of Trump's call with Zelenskiy since he had not yet read the transcript of the call. It was later confirmed by officials that he himself had been on the call.

Pompeo informed the chairmen of the House Foreign Affairs Committee, the House Intelligence Committee, and the House Oversight Committee that their subpoenas for documents regarding Trump's communications with the government of Ukraine "can be understood only as an attempt to 'intimidate, bully, and treat improperly, the distinguished professionals of the Department of State'". The three chairmen stated on October 1, 2019, "Any effort to intimidate witnesses or prevent them from talking with Congress—including State Department employees—is illegal and will constitute evidence of obstruction of the impeachment inquiry."

William B. Taylor Jr., acting ambassador to Ukraine and one of several current and former State Department officials appearing before congressional investigators, testified on October 22, 2019, that the White House was withholding military aid to Ukraine to force cooperation on U.S. domestic political issues, that Rudy Giuliani was running a shadow foreign policy effort parallel to official lines in the State Department, that when John Bolton and others fought the "effort to hijack" the U.S. relationship with Ukraine, Pompeo failed to respond directly to complaints, leaving Taylor to conclude that lack of timely, congressionally approved military aid would leave Ukrainians dying at the hands of Russian-led forces.

In his public testimony on November 20, 2019, Ambassador to the European Union Gordon Sondland noted in his opening statement that United States Secretary of Energy Rick Perry, then-U.S. Ambassador to NATO Kurt Volker and Sondland himself stayed in touch with Rudy Giuliani regarding the President's expectation that a public statement should be made by President Zelensky committing Ukraine to look into corruption issues, and that Giuliani "specifically mentioned the 2016 election (including the DNC server) and Burisma as two topics of importance to the President". Sondland said they kept the leadership of the NSC and State Department, including Pompeo, informed about their activities, and that as late as September 24, Pompeo was still telling Volker to talk with Giuliani.

An October 23, 2019, Freedom of Information Act (FOIA) request by the liberal watchdog group American Oversight persuaded a federal judge to give the State Department 30 days to release Ukraine-related records, including communications between Pompeo and President Trump's personal attorney, Rudy Giuliani. On November 22, the State Department released internal emails and documents bolstering Sondland's congressional testimony that Pompeo had participated in Giuliani's activities relating to Ukraine. Pompeo and Giuliani exchanged emails and phone calls in late March 2019, before Ambassador Marie Yovanovitch was recalled from Ukraine. The documents also showed that the State Department had deliberately deceived Congress about the rationale for Marie Yovanovitch's removal as Ambassador to Ukraine. Giuliani later admitted he had spoken to Pompeo on the phone in late March 2019 "to relay information he had gathered during his Ukrainian research". Upon Pompeo's request, he then provided him memos of his interviews of two former Ukrainian prosecutors. Giuliani said he later heard that the details of the memos were passed on to the State Department Inspector General (IG) and the F.B.I. for investigation.

On November 26, 2019, Pompeo appeared to grant legitimacy to a debunked conspiracy theory that Ukraine, rather than or in addition to Russia, was behind interference in the 2016 United States elections. He had been asked by a reporter "Do you believe that the U.S. and Ukraine should investigate the theory that it was Ukraine and not Russia that hacked the DNC emails in 2016?" Pompeo responded "Any time there is information that indicates any country has messed with American elections, we not only have a right but a duty to make sure we chase that down," adding "to protect our elections, America should leave no stone unturned."

COVID-19 pandemic

Pompeo said the U.S. government is trying to determine if the COVID-19 virus emanated from the Wuhan Institute of Virology. On April 23, 2020, Pompeo claimed that China had denied U.S. scientists permission to enter the country, in an effort to ascertain the origin of the current pandemic. He did not give details of any requests for such visits. On May 13, 2020, Pompeo made a swift visit to Israel for his first trip overseas since the outbreak of the coronavirus pandemic.

During a spike in case and death numbers in the pandemic, Pompeo hosted large indoor holiday parties involving hundreds of guests, as well as alcohol and food. The parties violated public health guidance and were described as superspreader events. They also violated Washington D.C.'s restrictions on sizable indoor gatherings. At the same time, the State Department was advising its employees not to have in-person gatherings. Photos from the event showed attendees not wearing masks consistently. In mid-December 2020, hundreds of invitees rejected invitations to go to one of Pompeo's parties. A day later, Pompeo cancelled the final holiday party after he had come in contact with a COVID-19 positive individual.

2019 emergency arms sale

In May 2019, Pompeo announced an "emergency" to push through $8.1billion of arms sales to Saudi Arabia and the United Arab Emirates, citing Iranian activity in the Middle East. This led to widespread Congressional opposition and eventually a probe by former State Department inspector general Steve Linick, who was fired by the Trump administration on Pompeo's recommendation. On August 10, 2020, the US State Department reported that Pompeo took proper procedures in declaring the "emergency". However, the statement issued by the department failed to fully assess the humanitarian impact of selling the weapons to the two Gulf countries, which had been using American bombs to wage a devastating war in Yemen, killing thousands of civilians.

Republican National Convention speech
On August 25, 2020, Pompeo recorded a speech during an official diplomatic visit to Jerusalem, during the Republican National Convention, in support of the incumbent and Republican presidential nominee Donald Trump. Following the speech, the House Foreign Affairs Committee's Oversight Subcommittee announced an investigation into whether the speech constituted a violation of the Hatch Act, which restricts executive branch civil service employees from participating in certain forms of political activity. In response, a spokesperson for the State Department said the department was not bearing any of the costs of the speech and that Pompeo was conducting the speech in his "personal capacity"; the Oversight Subcommittee Chairman, Joaquin Castro, said the speech was "highly unusual and likely unprecedented" and "it appears that it may also be illegal."

On August 28, Eliot Engel, Chairman of the Foreign Affairs Committee announced that the committee would be drafting a resolution holding Pompeo in contempt, saying "he has demonstrated alarming disregard for the laws and rules governing his own conduct and for the tools the constitution provides to prevent government corruption." It was confirmed on October 26 that the Office of the Special Counsel had launched a probe into Pompeo's speech.

Afghanistan and the Taliban

Pompeo was involved in negotiations with the Taliban that set the stage for a U.S. departure from Afghanistan. In early 2020, Pompeo touted the Trump administration’s agreement with the Taliban that put the U.S. on a trajectory to leave Afghanistan by May 2021. The deal required the Afghan government to release 5,000 imprisoned Taliban members. By August 2020, the Afghan government released all but 400 of the prisoners, as these prisoners had been accused of committing major crimes, according to the Council on Foreign Relations. Pompeo urged the Afghan government to release the remaining prisoners to remove "the last obstacle to the start of intra-Afghan negotiations". Within three days, the Afghan president agreed to the release, which was completed the next month.

Later, the Joe Biden administration extended the withdrawal timeline to August 2021, and Pompeo expressed support for it. However, after the U.S. had left Afghanistan, the Ashraf Ghani government rapidly collapsed and the Taliban regained substantial territory, Pompeo distanced himself and the Trump administration from the situation facing Afghanistan post-withdrawal.

Final days in office
After Joe Biden won the 2020 United States presidential election and Trump refused to concede while making false claims of fraud, Pompeo, when asked whether there would be a "smooth transition" to the Biden administration, responded on November 10, 2020: "There will be a smooth transition to a second Trump administration, all right. We're ready. The world is watching what's taking place here. We're gonna count all the votes. When the process is complete, they'll be electors selected."

The day after a pro-Trump mob stormed the U.S. Capitol to prevent the counting of the electoral votes (thus formalizing the upcoming presidency of Biden), the State Department told diplomats to affirm Biden's victory. On January 8, Pompeo met with Biden's incoming Secretary of State Antony Blinken. While other Trump Cabinet members resigned or took a low profile after the attack on the Capitol, in which Trump's role was debated, Pompeo remained a vocal defender of Trump, sending a Twitter message that promoted him as a potential Nobel Peace Prize nominee. He urged followers of the State Department's Twitter account to follow his personal account; criticized the news media, and complained about purported "censorship" of conservatives on social media websites.

On January 12, 2021, Pompeo cancelled a planned European trip when European diplomats declined to meet with him.

Pompeo made a large number of foreign policy decisions in the last weeks of the Trump administration leading up the inauguration of Joe Biden, including many likely to be reversed under Biden. Pompeo ordered the re-designation of Cuba as a "state sponsor of terrorism" and designating the Houthi rebels as a "foreign terrorist organization." The latter decision indirectly reduced humanitarian aid to Yemeni people, and it was quickly reversed by the Biden administration.

On January 19, 2021, Pompeo announced that the Department of State had determined that "genocide and crimes against humanity" had been perpetrated by China against the Uyghur Muslims and other ethnic minorities in Xinjiang. The announcement was made on the last day of the presidency of Donald Trump. On January 20, 2021, Pompeo along with other Trump administration officials were sanctioned by China. These individuals and their immediate family members were banned from entering mainland China, Hong Kong and Macao, and have also been restricted from doing business with China either individually or through their companies and institutions. President Biden's National Security Council called the sanctions "unproductive and cynical."

Potential 2020 U.S. Senate bid 

Following an announcement that U.S. Senator Pat Roberts, a four-term Republican, would not seek re-election in 2020, there was speculation that Pompeo would run for U.S. Senate from Kansas. He still had almost one million dollars in his congressional campaign account as of June 2019, which could be used in a Senate bid. In March 2019, Pompeo said he had ruled out a 2020 Senate run although he implied an openness to seeking statewide office in the future. In July 2019, Pompeo "appeared to re-open the door to a Kansas Senate run, telling a Kansas City radio station that he will 'always leave open the possibility that something will change'." Senate majority leader Mitch McConnell expressed a desire for Pompeo to enter the race. On July 29, Pompeo indicated that a 2020 Senate run was "off the table".

Nevertheless, speculation continued to swirl in August 2019 regarding a potential Senate run. The speculation was driven by concern that Kris Kobach, who lost the 2018 Kansas gubernatorial race, could become the GOP candidate for U.S. Senate if Pompeo does not run. Specifically, some Republicans feared Kobach would "again tap a conservative base, emerge from a crowded primary, alienate moderate voters and lose an otherwise safe seat that Republicans likely need to maintain their narrow Senate majority". Several other Republican candidates, including state Senate President Susan Wagle, Congressman Roger Marshall, and former Trump, Pompeo, and Koch network staffer Alan Cobb, the CEO and President of the Kansas Chamber of Commerce in 2019, said they would step aside if Pompeo entered the race.

On October 29, 2019, New Jersey Sen. Bob Menendez filed a complaint about Pompeo's repeated trips to Kansas, calling for review of whether Pompeo was engaging in political activity while traveling in an official capacity on taxpayer funds and thereby violating the Hatch Act of 1939. Menendez's complaint referenced a Wall Street Journal article saying that during his visit to Kansas, Pompeo met with GOP donor Charles Koch to discuss the Kansas senate race.

In an interview on November 22, 2019, Trump discussed Pompeo's interest in running for Senate from Kansas. Trump said that, in their discussion, Pompeo explained he would prefer to stay in his job as Secretary of State and would run only if it were necessary to keep a Republican seat in the Senate.

Efforts to recruit him into the race continued through the June 1 filing deadline, but he ultimately did not file. The general election was won by Republican U.S. Representative Roger Marshall.

Political positions

Foreign policy 
In 2013, Pompeo supported the surveillance programs of the National Security Agency, referring to the agency's efforts as "good and important work". In 2016 Pompeo stated, "Congress should pass a law re-establishing collection of all metadata, and combining it with publicly available financial and lifestyle information into a comprehensive, searchable database. Legal and bureaucratic impediments to surveillance should be removed. That includes Presidential Policy Directive-28, which bestows privacy rights on foreigners and imposes burdensome requirements to justify data collection." In March 2017, WikiLeaks began publishing a series of documents known as Vault 7, detailing the CIA's electronic surveillance and cyber warfare activities and capabilities. In an April 2017 speech addressing the Center for Strategic and International Studies, Pompeo called WikiLeaks "a non-state hostile intelligence service" and described Assange as a "narcissist" and "a fraud—a coward hiding behind a screen".

In a 2013 speech on the House floor, Pompeo said Muslim leaders who fail to denounce acts of terrorism done in the name of Islam are "potentially complicit" in the attacks. The Council on American–Islamic Relations called on him to revise his remarks, calling them "false and irresponsible". In 2016, ACT! for America gave Pompeo a "national security eagle award" for his comments on Islam. Pompeo has been a frequent guest on anti-Muslim activist Frank Gaffney's radio show for the Center for Security Policy. As a congressman, he cosponsored legislation to add the Muslim Brotherhood to the United States State Department list of Foreign Terrorist Organizations.

Pompeo opposed closing Guantanamo Bay detention camp. After a 2013 visit to the prison, he said, of the prisoners who were on hunger strike, "It looked to me like a lot of them had put on weight." He criticized the Obama administration's decision to end secret prisons and its requirement that all interrogators adhere to anti-torture laws.

In March 2014, he denounced the inclusion of a telecast by Edward Snowden at the South by Southwest conference in Austin, Texas, and asked that it be cancelled, predicting it would encourage "lawless behavior" among attendees. In February 2016, Pompeo said Snowden "should be brought back from Russia and given due process, and I think the proper outcome would be that he would be given a death sentence." But he has spoken in favor of reforming the Federal Records Act, one of the laws under which Snowden was charged, saying, "I'm not sure there's a whole lot of change that needs to happen to the Espionage Act. The Federal Records Act clearly needs updating to reflect the different ways information is communicated and stored. Given the move in technology and communication methods, I think it's probably due for an update."

On July 21, 2015, Pompeo and Senator Tom Cotton alleged the existence of secret side agreements between Iran and the International Atomic Energy Agency (IAEA) on procedures for inspection and verification of Iran's nuclear activities under the Joint Comprehensive Plan of Action. Obama administration officials acknowledged the existence of agreements between Iran and the IAEA governing the inspection of sensitive military sites but denied that they were "secret side deals", calling them standard practice in crafting arms-control pacts and saying the administration had provided information about them to Congress.

In November 2015, Pompeo visited Israel and said, "Prime Minister [Benjamin] Netanyahu is a true partner of the American people." He supported Trump's 2017 decision to move America's embassy in Israel to Jerusalem.

In 2017, Pompeo worked to undermine the Joint Comprehensive Plan of Action nuclear deal with Iran (which had been negotiated by the Obama administration) saying, "I look forward to rolling back this disastrous deal with the world's largest state sponsor of terrorism." He also said a better option than negotiating with Iran would be to use "under 2,000 sorties to destroy the Iranian nuclear capacity. This is not an insurmountable task for the coalition forces."

In 2017, it was reported that Pompeo had expressed desire for regime change in North Korea. In July 2017, he said "It would be a great thing to denuclearize the peninsula, to get those weapons off of that, but the thing that is most dangerous about it is the character who holds the control over them today."

In September 2018, Pompeo "backed continued U.S. military support for Saudi Arabia's war in Yemen over the objections of staff members after being warned that a cutoff could jeopardize $2billion in weapons sales to America's Gulf allies, according to a classified memo and people familiar with the decision".

In November 2018, Pompeo blamed Iran for the humanitarian crisis in Yemen, saying, "Iran causes death and destruction inside of Yemen and does nothing to prevent the starvation," while Saudi Arabia has "provided millions and millions of dollars of humanitarian relief" for Yemen.

While being interviewed on a podcast in 2023, Pompeo claimed that Israel has a biblical claim to the Palestinian territories, and therefore the situation can not be defined as an occupation. Pompeo made several explosive statements during the interview, including called Palestinian President Mahmoud Abbas, a "known terrorist".

China 

During his tenure as Secretary of State, Pompeo was an outspoken critic of China. Pompeo suggested that Chinese investment in Israel would create issues between the U.S. and Israel, and threatened to reduce security arrangements between the countries, although he also claimed that he would have no problems with open and transparent investments. He accused the World Health Organization of being under control of the People's Republic of China and implicated China as being behind the significant number of deaths in the UK as a result of the COVID-19 pandemic. He praised the UK when they started to push back against the Chinese Communist Party and its General Secretary Xi Jinping, especially with respect to Huawei. He also said he preferred a new coalition that did not need to go through established institutions that were set up by the United States, such as the United Nations. He argued that China was a "new tyranny" and it was the duty of "every leader of every nation" to stand up to China.

Pompeo has also argued that China's claims and activities in the South China Sea were illegal. In addition he said the Chinese authorities were not allowed to take unilateral action in the area. This is despite the fact that many, such as Walter A. McDougall's Promised Land, Crusader State (1997), John Lewis Gaddis's Surprise, Security, and the American Experience (2004), and Bradley F. Podliska's Acting Alone (2010) believe it is in the United States' own national interests to be allowed unilateral power. Michael Hirson, at Eurasia Group, argued that Pompeo was calling for regime change. He called on the Chinese people to betray their government and rise up to change the Chinese Communist Party.

On July 23, 2020, Pompeo, during his Communist China and the Free World's Future speech, announced the end of what he called "blind engagement" with the Chinese government. He also criticized Chinese Communist Party general secretary Xi Jinping as "a true believer in a bankrupt totalitarian ideology".

The former assistant secretary of state for East Asian and Pacific affairs, Daniel Russel, argued that it would have "the opposite effect, in bolstering support in China for Xi Jinping and deepening anger towards the United States". Michael Hirson noted that with the 2020 U.S. presidential election nearing, it was unlikely Chinese policymakers would do anything to change their relationship.

In September 2020, Pompeo accused the Chinese government of trying to foment racial unrest in the United States during an address to state lawmakers in Wisconsin.

In October 2020, Donald Trump was diagnosed with COVID-19, and Pompeo cancelled scheduled meetings with South Korea and Mongolia. However, he still met with allies from Australia, India and Japan, despite there being a risk of infecting his key counterparts, and accused the Chinese Communist Party of "exploitation, corruption and coercion".

Taiwan 
Visiting Taipei in 2022, Pompeo said that the U.S. should recognize Republic of China (Taiwan) as an independent country.

Russia 

During his confirmation hearing, Pompeo said Russia "has reasserted itself aggressively, invading and occupying Ukraine, threatening Europe, and doing nearly nothing to aid in the destruction and defeat of ISIS".

In August 2018, Pompeo called Russia to "immediately release" jailed Ukrainian filmmaker Oleg Sentsov.

In February 2022, right before Russia invaded Ukraine, Pompeo gave an interview in which he praised Russian president Vladimir Putin.  Russian state television aired the interview.  Pompeo's comments reflected comments made by Trump after the invasion praising Putin. The same month during a speech at a Conservative Political Action Conference Pompeo called Putin a "Dictator" over the invasion, though also stated that he has continues to believe that China is a greater national security threat to the United States then Russia.

During a speech at the Hudson Institute in June 2022 Pompeo described the Russian Invasion of Ukraine as a "planned genocide" that is designed to create a "new Russian Empire" similar to the Soviet Union with large amounts of energy reserves.

Energy and environment 

Speaking about climate change in 2013, Pompeo said: "There are scientists who think lots of different things about climate change. There's some who think we're warming, there's some who think we're cooling, there's some who think that the last 16 years have shown a pretty stable climate environment." He has said, "Federal policy should be about the American family, not worshipping a radical environmental agenda." In 2009 Pompeo signed the No Climate Tax pledge of Americans for Prosperity. He called the Obama administration's environment and climate change plans "damaging" and "radical". In 2012 he called for the permanent elimination of wind power production tax credits, calling them an "enormous government handout".

In 2015, Pompeo opposed the regulation of greenhouse gas emissions by the United States and supported eliminating the United States federal register of greenhouse gas emissions. As a member of the United States House Committee on Energy and Commerce, he voted for two resolutions disapproving of the Clean Power Plan implemented by the United States Environmental Protection Agency during the Obama administration.

In May 2019, Pompeo acted against environmental protection at the Arctic Council. He refused to sign on to a joint statement addressing the need for protection of the Arctic region from the threat of rapidly melting ice unless all mentions of climate change were removed from the document. He said, "Climate change is actually good for the Arctic, since melting ice caps are 'opening up new shipping routes' and thus making it more economically viable to expand oil drilling in the region."

He described the Paris climate accord, along with the World Health Organisation and Human Rights Council as one of the "three sins".

Health care 

Pompeo opposed the Affordable Care Act (ACA). Pompeo has been criticized for saying he supports funding for certain programs, yet opposing them when they are a part of the ACA. He accused the World Health Organization of being under control of the People's Republic of China. The WHO responded by saying Pompeo's comments were unacceptable and a distraction from dealing with the coronavirus pandemic. Dr. Maria Van Kerkhove, an American who was head of the WHO's emerging diseases and zoonosis unit at the time of the pandemic also expressed pride at the WHO for "saving lives". It was argued that the attempt to blame the WHO was a way to draw attention away from the failings of the Trump administration.

Social issues 

Pompeo has stated that life begins at conception and believes abortions should be allowed only when necessary to save the life of the mother, with no exceptions for rape. In 2011, he voted for the No Taxpayer Funding for Abortion Act, which would have banned federal health coverage that includes abortion. On May 31, 2011, he voted for H.R.2059 11-HR2059, which eliminated funding for the United Nations Population Fund.

He opposes same-sex marriage and sponsored bills to let states prevent same-sex couples from marrying.

Pompeo was instrumental in the development of the anti-abortion Geneva Consensus Declaration.

Economy 

Pompeo supported the United States federal government shutdown of 2013, blaming President Obama. He said he believed the shutdown was necessary to avoid an "American financial collapse 10 years from now".

International Criminal Court 

Mike Pompeo has continued a non-cooperative policy towards the International Criminal Court in The Hague, enacting sanctions against the ICC's chief prosecutor and other officials in September 2020. Some security experts have suggested Pompeo himself could potentially face charges under the ICC statutes for CIA activities in Afghanistan during his time as director of that agency.

Post-Trump administration

In January 2021, Pompeo joined the Hudson Institute as a distinguished fellow.

On January 20, 2021, following the inauguration of Joe Biden as the 46th President of the United States, China announced that it has imposed sanctions on Pompeo and 28 other Trump administration officials. In a statement, the Ministry of Foreign Affairs of China stated that it had decided to sanction those "who have seriously violated China's sovereignty and who have been mainly responsible for such U.S. moves on China-related issues." The sanctions prohibit these individuals and their immediate family members from entering mainland China, and special administrative regions of Hong Kong and Macao. They are also restricted from doing business with China, as are any companies or institutions associated with them. In response, the spokesperson of the United States National Security Council Emily Horne criticized the sanctions as an “unproductive and cynical move”.

In August 2022 it emerged that Pompeo was the target of an assassination plot by Iran.

In January 2023, HarperCollins published Pompeo's memoir of his tenure in the Trump Administration, Never Give an Inch: Fighting for the America I Love.

Personal life 

Pompeo married Leslie Libert in 1986. The couple later divorced. He then married Susan Justice Mostrous in 2000 and formally adopted her son, Nicholas.

Pompeo is affiliated with the Evangelical Presbyterian Church. Pompeo served as a local church deacon from 2007 to 2009 and taught Sunday school.

In 2014, Pompeo told a church group that Christians needed to "know that Jesus Christ as our savior is truly the only solution for our world". In 2015 in a talk at a church, Pompeo said that "politics is a never-ending struggle... until the Rapture."

In an interview with Fox News in January 2022, Pompeo said he has lost over 90 lb (41 kg) in the prior six months through self-guided exercises and dietary changes. Experts were skeptical of Pompeo's claim that such changes could have produced this weight loss in a man his age, and The Guardian said that Pompeo's history of misleading statements cast further doubt on his claims.

Foreign honors
Mike Pompeo was awarded:
 : The Order of Brilliant Star with Special Grand Cordon
: Doctor Honoris Causa, University of Tirana

See also 
 Foreign interference in the 2020 United States elections
 List of members of the American Legion
 List of people who have held multiple United States Cabinet-level positions
 Timeline of investigations into Trump and Russia (2019)

References

External links 
 State Department archive
 @SecPompeo

 Secretary of State biography
 CIA Director  biography
 

 
 Maplight Campaign Contributions 

|-

|-

|-

1963 births
2008 United States presidential electors
21st-century American diplomats
21st-century American politicians
American people of Italian descent
American Presbyterians
American anti-communists
Businesspeople in aviation
Christians from Kansas
Directors of the Central Intelligence Agency
Harvard Law School alumni
Hudson Institute
Kansas lawyers
Living people
Military personnel from California
Military personnel from Kansas
People from Orange, California
Politicians from Wichita, Kansas
Republican Party members of the United States House of Representatives from Kansas
Trump administration cabinet members
United States Army officers
United States Military Academy alumni
United States Secretaries of State
Williams & Connolly people
Recipients of the Order of Brilliant Star